Philippe Galli (8 July 1956, Strasbourg) is a French prefect.

Biography 

He graduated from ENA (École nationale d'administration) in 1988.

He is prefect of Seine-Saint-Denis since June 2013. He was also prefect of Corrèze (2005–2008), prefect of Loir-et-Cher (2008–2010) and prefect of Ain (2010-2013).

References 

1956 births
Living people
People from Strasbourg
École nationale d'administration alumni
Prefects of Corrèze
Prefects of Loir-et-Cher
Prefects of Ain
Officers of the Ordre national du Mérite
Chevaliers of the Légion d'honneur